GB Class 2 was a series of two trams and two trailers built by Skabo Jernbanevognfabrikk for Graakalbanen of Trondheim, Norway.

There were two compartments, both with four-abreast seating, with reversible seats. They had seating for 40 passengers.

The trams were ordered in 1941, and a single set of tram and trailer was delivered in May 1940. Not until 1947 were to additional trailers delivered. In 1950, the second motor was delivered from Siemens, and the first trailer could be rebuilt to a tram. The trams remained in service until 1973 when they were replaced by the TS Class 7 trams, following the merger of Graakalbanen into Trondheim Trafikkselskap, and the subsequent reorganizing of routes, so the Gråkallen Line was operated onwards along the Lademoen Line. No. 5 is preserved as a heritage tram at Trondheim Tramway Museum, while no. 6 was scrapped in 1983.

References

Trondheim Tramway stock

Multiple units of Norway
600 V DC multiple units